Brętowo is one of the quarters of the city of Gdańsk, Poland. It includes 2 osiedles, Niedźwiednik and Matemblewo, that are located inside Oliwa forests.

History
The area of the settlement belonged to the Cistercian abbey in Oliwa, which operated a mill, and was first mentioned in 1570 as Bringenthute. In the late 16th century it was property of the Schröer family from Danzig (Gdańsk) and consisted of the Schöer manor and a mill. In the 18th century an inn and two coppersmiths operated in the village. 

In the First Partition of Poland, in 1772, the settlement was annexed by Prussia, and from 1871 it was also part of Germany. In 1784, it was called Brentau. In 1885, it was inhabited by 216 people, a two-class school existed. In 1910 it consisted of 224 farm- and 76 residential buildings, inhabited by 1,179 people. The Forges and a grain mill still operated. In 1913, Brentau was connected to the railway line from Langfuhr (Wrzeszcz) to Kokoschken (Kokoszki). Following World War I it became part of the newly formed Free City of Danzig (Gdańsk). In the mid-1930s, the village occupied 372 ha and was inhabited by 1,845 people. On 15 August 1933 it was incorporated into the city limits of Danzig. In 1939, along with the city, it was annexed by Nazi Germany. Following Germany's defeat in World War II, in 1945, it became again part of Poland. In 1949, its Polish name Brętowo was officially confirmed.

Transport
The old (closed and now re-opened) railway track from Wrzeszcz to Kartuzy goes through the quarter, with Gdańsk Brętowo (PKP station) being the former station. As few railway bridges had been destroyed, their remnants were used by alpinists to train until the railway got reconstructed.

References

External links
 Map of Brętowo
 Old map of Brentau

Districts of Gdańsk